Central Pomo is an extinct Pomoan language spoken in Northern California. Pre-contact speakers of all the Pomoan languages have been estimated at 8,000 all together. This estimation was from the American anthropologist Alfred Kroeber.

"The Central Pomo language was traditionally spoken from the Russian River southwest of Clear Lake to the Pacific coast. There were settlements along the Russian River (in the southern Ukiah Valley, in Hopland Valley, and further south near the Sonoma County line), in the coastal region (at Manchester, Point Arena, and at the mouth of the Gualala River), and in the region between the two (around Yorkville and in Anderson Valley)."

It has a consonant inventory that is identical to the related Southern Pomo language with the following exceptions:

Central Pomo distinguishes velar  from uvular . It lacks a non-ejective alveolar affricate (i.e., it does not have /ts/ as a phoneme), and does not have length, in the form of geminate root consonants, as found in Southern Pomo.

As of 2013, a transcription project of Central Pomo materials collected by J.P. Harrington is underway.

Phonology

/e/ may also be heard as [ɛ].

References

External links
Central Pomo language overview at the Survey of California and Other Indian Languages
Central Pomo basic lexicon at the Global Lexicostatistical Database
OLAC resources in and about the Central Pomo language
Central Pomo Lesson Plans - CIMCC )PDF] 

Pomoan languages
Indigenous languages of California
Endangered Pomoan languages
Pomo tribe